The 2002 MAC men's basketball tournament, a part of the 2001–02 NCAA Division I men's basketball season, took place at Gund Arena in Cleveland.  Its winner received the Mid-American Conference's automatic bid to the 2002 NCAA tournament. It was a single-elimination tournament with four rounds and the three highest seeds received byes in the first round. All MAC teams were invited to participate. Kent State, the MAC regular season winner, received the number one seed in the tournament. The Flashes won the tournament, their third MAC Tournament championship, claiming the title 70–59 over Bowling Green. The announced crowd of 14,106 set a conference record for highest-attended tournament game. In the NCAA Tournament Kent State defeated Oklahoma State, Alabama, and Pittsburgh before losing to then eventual national runner-up Indiana Hoosiers in the Elite Eight.

Tournament

Seeds 
 Kent State
 Ball State
 Bowling Green
 Toledo
 Ohio
 Western Michigan
 Miami
 Marshall
 Northern Illinois
 Buffalo
 Akron
 Central Michigan
 Eastern Michigan

Bracket 

* – Denotes overtime period

First Round summary

Quarterfinal summary

Semifinal summary

Championship summary

Broadcast Information

ESPN2 announcers

Regional TV announcers

Local announcers

References 

Basketball in Cleveland
2001–02 Mid-American Conference men's basketball season
Mid-American Conference men's basketball tournament
MAC men's basketball